Terrance Darby Dill (born May 13, 1939) is an American professional golfer who has competed on the PGA Tour, Champions Tour, and most recently, the European Seniors Tour.

Dill won one tournament on the Senior PGA Tour (now Champions Tour), the 1992 Bank One Classic. He also won the par-3 contest at the Masters Tournament.

Professional wins (1)

Senior PGA Tour wins (1)

Senior PGA Tour playoff record (0–1)

References

External links

American male golfers
Texas Longhorns men's golfers
PGA Tour golfers
PGA Tour Champions golfers
European Senior Tour golfers
Golfers from Texas
Sportspeople from Fort Worth, Texas
People from Lakeway, Texas
1939 births
Living people